Russian pop music is Russian language pop music produced either in Russia, CIS countries, Baltic states and other foreign countries in which the songs are performed primarily in Russian language, languages of the countries of the CIS, and in the other languages of the world. This is the successor to popular "variety" Soviet music with its pop idols such as Alla Pugacheva or Valery Leontiev.

Modern-day mainstream Russian-language pop music is very diverse and has many ways to spread through the audience. The most famous pop stars can be seen on general television in music or talk shows, and also on music TV channels such as MTV Russia and Muz-TV. There are also Russian Pop radio stations, and there have been many One-hit wonders in recent years.

The Russian-language music market

Russian-language market of popular music began to grow with the increase of Soviet influence in the world arena. In addition to the nearly 300 million Soviet citizens living in the 13% of the world landmass in 1990, Soviet pop music has become popular in the countries of the former Warsaw Pact, especially in the Slavic regions (Poland, Czech Republic, Slovakia, Bulgaria and the former Yugoslavia, but also in Romania, Hungary, China, Cuba).

The undisputed center of the creation of the Russian-language pop music of that time was the Moscow and, to a lesser extent, St. Petersburg. After the dissolution of the Soviet Union, Russia is still a major producer and consumer of Russian-speaking music, demand is still high in some of the new independent states, especially Ukraine and Belarus. For quite significant regional centers contemporary Russian language popular music include, in addition to Moscow, St. Petersburg and Kyiv (Ukraine), which is also focused on the Russian-speaking market.

The dissolution of the Soviet Union and the fall of the Iron Curtain, the mass emigration of the early '90s, led to the formation of large Russian-speaking diaspora in the European Union, Canada, the United States, Australia and other regions, where the local population has had an opportunity to get acquainted with the Russian music of different genres, through the Internet, satellite television, various media, music in nightclubs.

A notable contribution to Russian pop music performers that do not come from Russia. Among them: Philipp Kirkorov from Bulgaria, Ani Lorak and Verka Serduchka from Ukraine, Laima Vaikule from Latvia, Seryoga and Dmitry Koldun from Belarus, Avraam Russo from Syria, A-Studio from Kazakhstan and others.

In the Billboard charts

See also

Russian pop singers
Music of Russia

References

 https://www.bbc.co.uk/music/articles/178cff06-e9eb-4d7c-ae71-3afc900c8d40
 https://www.calvertjournal.com/features/show/3840/90s-pop-videos
 https://brightestyoungthings.com/articles/the-byt-guide-to-russian-pop-music
 https://bandcamp.com/tag/russian-pop
 https://www.billboard.com/articles/business/8499804/vladimir-putin-russia-pop-music-support-rap-crackdown

Pop
Pop music by country
Pop music genres